The 1998–99 Detroit Titans men's basketball team represented the University of Detroit Mercy in the 1998–99 NCAA Division I men's basketball season. Led by coach Perry Watson, the Titans played their home games at Calihan Hall as members of the Midwestern Collegiate Conference. They finished the season 25–6 overall, 12–2 in Horizon League play to win the regular season league title.

Playing in the MCC tournament as the No. 1 seed, they defeated UIC, Cleveland State, and Butler to win the conference tournament title and received an automatic bid to the NCAA tournament as No. 12 seed in the South region. The Titans beat No. 5 seed UCLA in the opening round before losing to No. 4 seed Ohio State in the second round.

This 1998–99 team, which tied the school record with 25 wins, reached the NCAA Tournament in back-to-back seasons for the first, and only, time in school history.

Roster

Schedule and results

|-
!colspan=9 style=| Regular season

|-
!colspan=9 style=| MWCC Tournament

|-
!colspan=9 style=| NCAA Tournament

References

Detroit Titans
Detroit Mercy Titans men's basketball seasons
Detroit
Detroit Titans men's b
Detroit Titans men's b